The 2007–08 Washington Wizards season was their 47th season in the National Basketball Association. The Wizards made the playoffs for the fourth straight season despite missing star Gilbert Arenas for most of it due to a knee injury. The Wizards were then eliminated for the third straight time by the Cavaliers, all in just the first round.

Key dates prior to the start of the season:
 The 2007 NBA draft took place in New York City on June 28.
 The free agency period begins in July.

Offseason

Draft picks
Washington's selections from the 2007 NBA draft in New York City.

Roster

Standings

Standings

Record vs. opponents

Game log

October
Record: 0–1; Home: 0–0; Road: 0–1

November
Record: 7–8; Home: 3–3; Road: 4–5

December
Record: 8–5; Home: 6–3; Road: 2–2

January
Record: 9–6; Home: 6–2; Road: 3–4

February
Record: 4–10; Home: 1–4; Road: 3–6

March
Record: 10–6; Home: 5–3; Road: 5–3

April
Record: 5–3; Home: 4–1; Road: 1–2

 Green background indicates win
 Red background indicates loss

Playoffs

|- bgcolor="edbebf"
| 1 || April 19 || @ Cleveland || 86–93 || Arenas (24) || Jamison (19) || Stevenson (5) ||Quicken Loans Arena20,562 || 0–1
|- bgcolor="edbebf"
| 2 || April 21 || @ Cleveland || 86–116 || Butler, Songaila, Stevenson (12) || Jamison (9) || Butler (5) ||Quicken Loans Arena20,562 || 0–2
|- bgcolor="bbffbb"
| 3 || April 24 || Cleveland || 108–72 || Stevenson (19) || Blatche, Jamison (7) || Daniels (6) ||Verizon Center20,173 || 1–2
|- bgcolor="edbebf"
| 4 || April 27 || Cleveland || 97–100 || Jamison (23) || Jamison (11) || Stevenson (5) ||Verizon Center20,173 || 1–3
|- bgcolor="bbffbb"
| 5 || April 30 || @ Cleveland || 88–87 || Butler (32) || Jamison (11) || Butler (5) ||Quicken Loans Arena20,562 || 2–3
|- bgcolor="edbebf"
| 6 || May 2 || Cleveland || 88–105 || Jamison (23) || Jamison (15) || Daniels (5) ||Verizon Center20,173 || 2–4
|-

Player stats

Regular season

Playoffs

Awards and records

Records

Milestones

Transactions
The Wizards have been involved in the following transactions during the 2007–08 season.

Trades

Free agents

See also
 2007–08 NBA season

References

Washington Wizards seasons
2007–08 NBA season by team
Wash
Wash